Miguel Hernández Agosto (April 5, 1927 – March 18, 2016) was a Puerto Rican politician whose service in government spanned several generations. Affiliated with the Popular Democratic Party (PPD), he started his political career as a Cabinet member, but eventually became a Senator at-large. Hernández Agosto served as President of the Senate of Puerto Rico for 12 years (1981-1993).

Early years and education 
Hernández Agosto was born on April 5, 1927, in Las Piedras, Puerto Rico.

Hernández Agosto finished his bachelor studies in agricultural sciences from the University of Puerto Rico at Mayagüez at the age of 19. Next year, he completed a master's degree from Michigan State University, and later a PhD from University of Michigan. Hernández Agosto is a member of the Latino fraternity Phi Iota Alpha, the oldest inter-collegiate Greek-letter organization established for Latino Americans.

Professional career 
During his youth, Hernández Agosto served as a science and math teacher at high schools in Humacao and Juncos.

Public service 
From 1960 to 1965, Hernández Agosto served as executive director of the Puerto Rico Lands Authority under Gov. Luis Muñoz Marín, who subsequently appointed him as Secretary of the Puerto Rico Department of Agriculture, a position he also held under the governorship of Roberto Sánchez Vilella.

In 1970, he entered elective politics as a senator at-large, filling the vacancy created by the resignation of then-Sen. Muñoz Marín. Two years later, he was elected senator for the Popular Democratic Party (PPD). One year after his election, he was named vice-president of the Senate. Hernández Agosto was reelected in 1976 and appointed as minority speaker.

In 1981, after being reelected again, Hernández Agosto became the Senate of Puerto Rico's ninth president, a position he held for 12 years. In 1993, after the Popular Democratic Party of Puerto Rico's defeat in the 1992 elections, he became again the Senate Minority Leader of his party until 1996.

Hernández Agosto was president of the Popular Democratic Party from 1978 to 1981, and presided the Committee for the Quincentenary of the discovery of America and Puerto Rico.

At the national level, Hernández Agosto was affiliated with the Democratic Party. After winning a bruising reorganization primary campaign in 1988 against former Governor Carlos Romero Barceló, he became State Chair of the Democratic Party of Puerto Rico, a post he held until 1992.

Retirement and death 
In his final years, Hernández Agosto was a part-time law professor at the Interamerican University of Puerto Rico School of Law and practiced law. In 2008, he chaired then-Gov. Aníbal Acevedo Vilá's unsuccessful reelection campaign.

Hernández Agosto died on March 18, 2016. Gov. Alejandro García Padilla ordered flags to be raised at half-staff for five days in his honor.

See also 

 List of Puerto Ricans
 Senate of Puerto Rico

References

External links 
 Official Biography from the Senate of Puerto Rico

|-

1927 births
2016 deaths
Members of the Senate of Puerto Rico
Michigan State University alumni
People from Las Piedras, Puerto Rico
Presidents of the Senate of Puerto Rico
Presidents pro tempore of the Senate of Puerto Rico
Puerto Rican party leaders
Puerto Rican Roman Catholics
Democratic Party (Puerto Rico) politicians
Popular Democratic Party (Puerto Rico) politicians
Secretaries of Agriculture of Puerto Rico
University of Michigan alumni